William Milton Breakenridge (December 25, 1846 – January 31, 1931) was an American lawman, teamster, railroader, soldier and author.

Early life 

Breakenridge was born in Watertown, Wisconsin, to George D. and Elisa Ann Breakenridge. United States Census records from 1850 and 1860 indicate that he had an older brother, an older sister, and a younger sister.

After leaving Wisconsin at the age of 16, Breakenridge joined the United States Army, eventually serving under Colonel John Chivington with the Colorado Territorial Militia during the Sand Creek Massacre (also known as the Chivington massacre). Following his stint with the army, he moved on to Arizona, eventually ending up in Phoenix where he became a Maricopa County deputy sheriff.

Tombstone, Arizona 

After staying in Phoenix for about a year, Breakenridge went south to Cochise County and the growing mining town of Tombstone. He served as a deputy sheriff under Cochise County Sheriff Behan during the 1880s at the time of the Gunfight at the O.K. Corral. Most old-west historians  consider Breakenridge, like his boss Behan, to have been a friend to the local outlaw cowboys. Ike Clanton filed murder charges against Wyatt, Virgil and Morgan Earp along with Doc Holliday for killing Billy Clanton, Frank McLaury and Tom McLaury in the shoot out.

Later life and Helldorado

After leaving Tombstone shortly after the gunfight at the OK Corral, Breakenridge later served as a deputy U.S. marshal, a surveyor, and as a claims agent for the Southern Pacific Railroad.

In 1927, according to historian David Leighton, Wyatt Earp returned to Tucson, likely for the last time, and met with Breakenridge at the Old Pueblo Club. While the purpose of the meeting remains unknown, it might have been
to informally obtain information from Earp, for Breakenridge's future book.

In 1928, he became a published author with the release of his memoirs of life in Tombstone and the old west, Helldorado: Bringing the Law to the Mesquite. Critics of the book, including Wyatt Earp and his wife Josie, claimed that much of what Breakenridge wrote was biased and more fiction than factual. Although Breakenridge met with Earp in Los Angeles to interview him, the picture he painted of Earp was less than flattering.

Portrayed as a thief, pimp, crooked gambler, and murderer, Earp loudly protested the book's contents until his death in 1929, and his wife continued in the same vein afterward. Nonetheless, the book was a success and generated so much interest that Tombstone's citizens joined together in 1929 to create an annual October celebration, Helldorado Days, commemorating the gunfight at the OK Corral. The celebration continues today.

Death 

Breakenridge died before dawn from cardiac failure on January 31, 1931, aged 84, in Tucson, Arizona. His death certificate stated that he had previously undergone surgery for cardiac problems. He is buried in Evergreen Cemetery in Tucson.

References 

1846 births
1931 deaths
American deputy sheriffs
Lawmen of the American Old West
People from Cochise County, Arizona
People from Watertown, Wisconsin